René Školiak (born 28 January 1979) is a Slovak professional ice hockey player who played with HC Slovan Bratislava in the Slovak Extraliga.

References

Living people
HC Slovan Bratislava players
Slovak ice hockey centres
Sportspeople from Liptovský Mikuláš
1979 births
HK Dubnica players
HK 36 Skalica players
HC Slavia Praha players
Slovak expatriate ice hockey players in the Czech Republic